LaSalle Parish School Board is a school district headquartered in Jena, Louisiana, United States, serving LaSalle Parish. As of 2008 the superintendent of schools is Mr. Roy Breithaupt.

The LaSalle Parish School District is divided into 10 wards.

School Board Members

Ward 1 - W. O. Poole
Ward 2 - Howard McCarty
Ward 3 - Johnny Fryar
Ward 4 - Eli Cooper
Ward 5 - Billy Wayne Fowler
Ward 6 - Buddy Bethard
Ward 7 - Walter Creel
Ward 8 - Dolan Pendarvis
Ward 9 - Charlie Anderson (President of the Board)
Ward 10 - Melvin Worthington (Vice-President of the Board)

Schools

High schools
 Jena High School (Jena) (Giants)
 LaSalle High School  (Olla) (Tigers)

K-8 schools
 Fellowship Elementary School (Unincorporated area)
 Nebo Elementary School (Unincorporated area)

6-8 schools
 LaSalle Junior High School (Urania)

7-8 schools
 Jena Junior High School (Jena)

4-6 schools
 Goodpine Middle School (Unincorporated area)

PK-5 schools
 Olla-Standard Elementary School (Olla)

PreK-3 schools
 Jena Elementary School (Jena)

External links
 LaSalle Parish School Board

Education in LaSalle Parish, Louisiana
School districts in Louisiana